Cranfield United Football Club is a football club based in Cranfield, near Bedford, Bedfordshire, England. The club is affiliated to the Bedfordshire County Football Association. They are currently members of the Bedfordshire County Football League Premier Division.

History
The club was formed in 1903. After the first world war they played in the Bedford and District League and then moved to the North Bucks & District Football League in 1930. They joined Division 2b of the South Midlands League in 1949, and won it at the first attempt, winning promotion to Division one. They were promoted to the premier division in the 1952–53 seasons when they finished as runners-up. The club remained in the premier division until the 1955–56 season when they were relegated to Division one, and three seasons later they were relegated again to the Bedford and District League.

The club returned to the South Midlands League, in the 1976–77 season, starting in Division one. The club remained in Division one until the end of the 1995–96 season, except for three seasons from 1985–86 when they were in the premier division. The club left the South Midlands League again in 1996. In 2001 the club joined the Spartan South Midlands Football League in Division Two and four seasons later they were promoted to Premier Division.

In the 2009–10 they played in the FA Cup for the first ever time, losing to Crawley Green 3–1 in the extra preliminary qualifying round.

Cranfield United resigned for the Spartan South Midlands League at the end of the 2012–13 season and took their reserve team's place in Division Two of the Bedfordshire County League.
At the end of the 2014-2015 season Cranfield United's first team won the Bedfordshire County Football League Division One as Champions, and were promoted to the Premiership Division for the 2015-2016 Season.
The Reserve side also won the Bedfordshire League Division three as Champions during the same season, and for the 2015-2016 season will be playing in Division Two.

Ground

Cranfield United play their home games at Crawley Road, Cranfield, Bedfordshire, MK43 0AA.

Honours

League honours
South Midlands League Division One:
 Runners up (1): 1952–53
South Midlands League Division 2b:
 Winners (1): 1949–50

Cup honours
Bedfordshire Senior Cup:
 Runners up (1): 1952–53

Records

Highest League Position: 4th in South Midlands League 1954–55
FA Cup best performance: Extra Preliminary qualifying round 2009–10, 2012–13  
FA Vase best performance: Second Qualifying round 2006–07, 2008–09, 2010–11

References

External links

Football clubs in Bedfordshire
1903 establishments in England
Association football clubs established in 1903
Football clubs in England
Bedfordshire County Football League
North Bucks & District Football League
South Midlands League
Spartan South Midlands Football League
United F.C.